Bade Achche Lagte Hain means "I like it very much". 

Bade Achche Lagte Hain may also refer to:

 Bade Achche Lagte Hain (song), a song from the 1976 Indian film Balika Badhu
 Bade Achche Lagte Hain, a 2011 Indian television series
 Bade Achhe Lagte Hain 2, a 2021 Indian television series